Tejuçuoca is a municipal of the state of Ceará (CE), located in the northeast of Brazil.

population: 19,371 (2020)
Area: 750.605 km²

References

Municipalities in Ceará